The sixth season of the reality television series Love & Hip Hop: Atlanta aired on VH1 from March 6, 2017 until July 17, 2017. The show was primarily filmed in Atlanta, Georgia. It is executively produced by Mona Scott-Young and Stephanie R. Gayle for Monami Entertainment, Toby Barraud, Stefan Springman, Mala Chapple, David DiGangi, Lashan Browning and Donna Edge-Rachell for Eastern TV, and Nina L. Diaz, Liz Fine and Vivian Gomez for VH1. 

The series chronicles the lives of several women and men in the Atlanta area, involved in hip hop music. It consists of 18 episodes, including a two-part reunion special hosted by Nina Parker.

Production

On February 21, 2017, VH1 announced Love & Hip Hop: Atlanta would be returning for a sixth season on March 6, 2017. A 5-minute long "super-trailer" was released on February 27, 2017. With the exception of K. Michelle, despite persistent rumors of a mass firing, all main cast members from the previous season returned, along with Tommie Lee, who was promoted to the main cast. Social media personality Lovely Mimi joined the supporting cast, along with club promoter Melissa Scott, Kirk's alleged mistress Jasmine Washington, her lovers Rod Bullock and Keanna Arnold, beauty shop owner Sierra Gates, her assistant Moriah Lee and her husband Shooter Gates. Although not included in the initial cast announcement, aspiring radio personality Tresure Price, aspiring singer Estelita Quintero, Stevie J's daughter Savannah Jordan and Tommie's mother Samantha would also appear in supporting roles. Rapper Gunplay appeared as a supporting cast member for one episode, his appearance serving as a teaser for the then upcoming spin-off Love & Hip Hop: Miami.

On April 19, 2017, VH1 announced that Joseline's Special Delivery, a special documenting the birth of Joseline's child, will air between the season's eighth and ninth episodes on May 1, 2017. It premiered to 2.18 million viewers. Additionally, Dirty Little Secrets 2, a special featuring unseen footage and deleted scenes from the show's second season up until season five, aired on May 10, 2017 to over 1 million viewers.

Production on the season became increasingly troubled, with later episodes showing scenes of Joseline Hernandez and Kirk Frost breaking the fourth wall to express their displeasure with the producers. Long time cast members Bambi Benson, Ariane Davis and Deb Antney had their screen time reduced dramatically while Dawn Heflin was phased out of the show nearly entirely (having only two minor guest appearances). On January 27, 2017, Bambi was hospitalized during filming, and later confirmed to have quit the show due to her drama with Scrappy. Behind the scenes during the reunion taping on June 1, 2017, tensions between Joseline, Mona Scott-Young and the other producers exploded, with Joseline announcing that she had quit the show after six seasons. 

With this season, Love & Hip Hop: Atlanta became the first incarnation of the franchise to reach 100 episodes.

Synopsis
The season opens with a heavily pregnant Joseline at war with Stevie over the paternity of her child. Karlie and Yung Joc have rekindled their romance, however she finds it difficult to forget his past treatment of her. Tammy has left Waka; while she's focused of being single and independent, he makes big attempts to win her back and fight for their family. Tommie is dealing with the legal repercussions of her violent feud with Joseline last year. At Joseline's masquerade-themed party, Karlie and Joc are shocked when they approached by a woman named Jasmine, who claims the father of her baby born a few months ago is Kirk and him and Rasheeda face the major challenges heading towards their marriage.

Reception
The series premiere garnered big ratings for the network, with VH1 announcing a combined rating of 5.2 million viewers, up 17% from its fifth season bow. However, ratings soon decreased and the show began receiving criticism for its focus on the new cast members and their little-to-no connection with the hip hop music industry, as well as their allegedly fabricated storylines. Funky Dineva, who has recapped the show for six years and appeared in early episodes of the show, slammed the storyline involving Sierra and Moriah as "phony and fake" and said executive producer Mona Scott-Young "should be ashamed" to put her name on "this garbage ass, fake ass, bullshit ass show".

Cast

Starring

 Mimi Faust (13 episodes)
 Rasheeda (15 episodes)
 Karlie Redd (16 episodes)
 Tammy Rivera (15 episodes)
 Tommie Lee (13 episodes)
 Joseline Hernandez (14 episodes)
 Stevie J (15 episodes)

Also starring

 Yung Joc (16 episodes)
 Melissa Scott (13 episodes)
 Jasmine Washington (8 episodes)
 Kirk Frost (12 episodes)
 Rod Bullock (5 episodes)
 Momma Dee (8 episodes)
 Ernest Bryant (6 episodes)
 Lil Scrappy (9 episodes)
 Karen King (7 episodes)
 Waka Flocka Flame (5 episodes)
 Jessica Dime (15 episodes)
 Keanna Arnold (4 episodes)
 Bambi Benson (3 episodes)
 Sierra Gates (8 episodes)
 Moriah Lee (7 episodes)
 Lovely Mimi (10 episodes)
 Tresure P (9 episodes)
 Shooter Gates (4 episodes)
 Deb Antney (3 episodes)
 Ariane Davis (5 episodes)
 Gunplay (1 episode)
 Shirleen Harvell (7 episodes)  
 Estelita Quintero (7 episodes)
 Savannah Jordan (6 episodes)
 Samantha Lee (6 episodes)

Stevie J's daughter Sade Jordan, Shawne Williams, Black Ink Crews Ceaser Emmanuel and Jasmine's ex-boyfriend Logan Bullard would appear as guest stars in several episodes. The show features minor appearances from notable figures within the hip hop industry and Atlanta's social scene, including Young Dro, Ernest's mother Bessie Bryant, Alexis Skyy, Jasmine Burke, Bobby V, Stevie J's son Dorian Jordan, Sina Bina, Dawn Heflin, Joseline's brother Kermit Silva, Stevie J and Mimi's daughter Eva Jordan, Kandi Burruss, Spice, Kelsie Frost, Ky Frost and Stevie Jordan Jr.

Episodes

Music
Several cast members had their music featured on the show and released singles to coincide with the airing of the episodes.

References

External links

2017 American television seasons
Love & Hip Hop